The 2021 Major Arena Soccer League season is the thirteenth season for the league. While there are 17 teams in the league, only 11 opted to play for the season due to the COVID-19 pandemic. However, by mid-season, four more opted not to play, which only left the league with 7 teams playing.

Standings

Tiebreakers are as follows: Win%, Head to Head, Goal Differential, Wins, Losses.

Playoffs
Top seed chooses its opponent in the second round, bracket subject to change. 
Each Round is a two game series plus a mini game, if necessary

References

 
Major Arena Soccer League seasons
Major